The Center for Advanced Defense Studies is a 501(c)(3) nonprofit research organization that provides data-driven analysis and evidence-based reporting on global conflict and transnational security issues.

C4ADS specializes in using Publicly Available Information (PAI) and cutting-edge technologies to detect and disrupt illicit networks around the world. Incorporating field research from conflict zones and fragile states, they produce analysis on a range of conflict and security issues and inform a whole-of-society approach against illicit actors embedded within international systems of finance, commerce, and transportation.

C4ADS engages with partners in the public sector, private sector, and civil society to move beyond advocacy to action.

Programs
Environmental Crimes Fusion Cell
C4ADS works with a global network of 150 partner organizations across the conservation, enforcement, and regulatory communities to put a stop to wildlife trafficking through international systems of finance and transportation. They actively support enforcement and policy initiatives in a variety of ways, including through the Reducing Opportunities for Unlawful Transport of Endangered Species (ROUTES) Partnership.

Organized Crime and Grand Corruption
C4ADS seeks to map the networks engaging in illicit activities through collection and analysis of public records and collaboration with local partners. Current focus areas include: asset flight in Latin America, forced labor in Southeast Asia, and money laundering in Eastern Europe.

Conflict Finance and Irregular Threats
C4ADS identifies and exposes the financial drivers of conflict, how small arms and key technologies are supplied to conflict zones, and how external actors perpetuate violence. Their goal is to reduce the human cost and the threat to international peace and security posed by civil wars, insurgencies and grey zone conflict. Focus areas include: Libya, Somalia, South Sudan, Sudan, Syria, Ukraine, and Yemen.

Natural Resources
C4ADS aims to counter illicit resource extraction by investigating the beneficial ownership networks behind these shadow industries. In particular, they seek to determine complicit importers and other actors by identifying those who enable or engage in the illicit movement of natural resources, and by mapping natural resources supply chains to illuminate differences between legal, illegal, and “gray area” actors. Current projects extend throughout the Americas, Africa, and East and Southeast Asia.

Counterproliferation
C4ADS exposes how states develop weapons of mass destruction & disruption programs via illicit procurement, technology transfer, espionage, and intellectual property theft. They also monitor compliance with the multilateral nonproliferation regime, namely export control agreements and sanctions programs. Current projects focus most predominantly on China, Russia, Iran, North Korea, and Pakistan.

Human Security
C4ADS exposes the illicit networks and systems underlying human rights crises and empowers global stakeholders to act decisively against those who threaten human security worldwide. They uncover human security crimes and their perpetrating networks and use publicly available information (PAI) to map their connections to global systems. These linkages include global supply chains, financial flows, and transit routes, which C4ADS maps using an array of publicly available data sources.

References

External links 

 

Think tanks based in Washington, D.C.
Non-profit organizations based in Washington, D.C.
Think tanks established in 1999
1999 establishments in Washington, D.C.